Snapping (or clicking) one's fingers is the act of creating a snapping or clicking sound with one's fingers. Primarily this is done by building tension between the thumb and another (middle, index, or ring) finger and then moving the other finger forcefully downward, so it hits the palm of the same hand at a high speed.

A Georgia Institute of Technology study in 2021 analyzed finger snapping, and found that a given audible snap sound occurs in just seven milliseconds. For reference, the blink of an eye takes place in 150 milliseconds.

In culture 

In Ancient Greece, snapping of fingers was used by musicians and dancers as a way to keep the rhythm  and it was known with the words "ἀποληκέω" (apolekeo), "ἀποκρότημα" (apokrotema) (from the verb "ἀποκροτέω" - apokroteo, "to snap the fingers") and "ἐπίπταισμα" (epiptaisma). Finger snapping is still common in modern Greece.

Finger snapping may be used as a substitute for hand clapping. A possible reason is that snapping is less disruptive than clapping during speeches and announcements." The practice of finger snapping is also popular within the poetry slam community, used by the audience as a spontaneous in-the-moment show of support or agreement with what is being shared by the poet. The practice has also infiltrated some conferences.

Pop culture
Finger snapping at someone has long been used as a sassy diva gesture, done to express a taunting satisfaction following what one has considered to be an impressive insult or diss. Sometimes finger-snapping is done in rapid succession for emphasis and combined with other types of sassy diva mannerisms, such as swivel-hipping and head-gyrating. It is largely associated with gay men and females, particularly gay black American men and black American women. It was derived in the 1980s and 90s from Black American gay male subcultures.

In Avengers: Infinity War, Thanos snaps his fingers causing the Blip.

In music 
In many cultures, finger snapping is a form of body percussion.

Sounds of a fingersnap also are sampled and used in many disparate genres of music, used mostly as percussion; the works of Angelo Badalamenti exhibit this in the soundtracks to, e.g., Twin Peaks, Lost Highway, as does the theme song from the television series The Addams Family. Furthermore, a subgenre of hip hop known as snap music formed in the early 2000s in the southern United States.

Persian variant 
Beshkan (Persian: بشكن), also known as the "Persian snap", is a traditional Iranian finger snap requiring both hands. The snapper creates a clicking noise similar in mechanism to the normal snap but louder in practice.

Technique 
There are two variations of the Persian snap. The most common of the two for a right-handed individual is as follows:

 Place hands together and rotate until the three right hand fingers are at the junction of the hand and fingers.
 Rest the right middle finger on the left hand securely.
 Then using the tension provided by the left thumb, snap the right index finger onto the gap between the junction and right middle finger.

References 

Articles containing video clips
Body percussion
Hand gestures